Anahí is the first LP by Mexican singer Anahí. The songs were recorded when she was nine years old. However, it was hampered by a lack of recording and production cohesion and did not do well commercially. Anahí recorded this LP with Discos America in 1993. It is officially a promotional album – it is not considered an official album from Anahí's discography and is no longer available. The song "Te Doy un Besito" served to close a children's show in Mexico and was the only track to promote the album. All the tracks were written by Daniel Garcia and Mario Schajris except "El Ratón Pérez" alongside Sciamerella.

Track listing

References

External links
Anahí's official website

1993 debut albums
Anahí albums
Spanish-language albums